The chairperson of the Metropolitan Manila Development Authority is the chief executive officer of the Metropolitan Manila Development Authority (MMDA) and the presiding officer of the Metro Manila Council. The post is also known as the Officer-in-Charge (OIC) when the post is held in an acting capacity.

Eligibility
The Chairperson of the MMDA is appointed by the President of the Philippines. The appointment of the chairperson is subject to the same disqualifications and prohibitions of a member of the Cabinet but not subject for a confirmation from the Commission on Appointments.

Functions
The Chairperson of the MMDA is also the presiding officer of the Metro Manila Council. The Chairperson is tasked to execute the policies and measures approved by the Metro Manila Council as well as oversee the management and operations of the MMDA.

List
Metropolitan Manila Authority

Metropolitan Manila Development Authority

See also
Governor of Metro Manila

Notes

References

 
Metropolitan Manila Development Authority